Lead Mountain may refer to:

Lead Mountain (Custer County, Colorado)
Lead Mountain (Grand County, Colorado)
Lead Mountain (Maine)